Kaique Negri (born 26 November 1993) is a Brazilian footballer who plays for Miami Dade FC, as a midfielder.

Career

On May 30, 2014 Negri made his official debut for Miami Dade FC, scoring 1 goal.

Honors

Miami Dade FC
 '''NAL  CHAMPION 2014

References

1993 births
Living people
Brazilian footballers
Association football midfielders
Miami Dade FC players